St. George's Anglican Church is a parish of Anglican Church of Australia in the Diocese of Tasmania, located in Cromwell Street, Battery Point, Hobart, Tasmania. The historic parish church was designed by John Lee Archer in 1838, and is built of sandstone. The church's bell tower and portico designed by James Blackburn were added later. The tower served as a landmark to guide navigation on the estuarine part of the Derwent River.

See also 

Anglican Church of Australia

References

External links
 

Churches in Hobart
1838 establishments in Australia
George, Battery Point
19th-century Anglican church buildings
Tasmanian Heritage Register
Churches completed in 1838
19th-century churches in Australia